Tinosporide is a chemical compound classified as a diterpenoid and a furanolactone.  It was first isolated from the plant Tinospora cordifolia, from which it derives its name.  It has since been found in other plants of the genus Tinospora, such as Tinospora glabra.

Because Tinospora cordifolia has been used in traditional herbal medicine, there has been research directed at exploring the potential pharmacology of tinosporide and related compounds.

Related compounds
Other diterpenoid furanolactones with a similar structure include columbin, palmarin, and chasmanthin.

External links

Furans
Lactones
Diterpenoids
Heterocyclic compounds with 5 rings
Epoxides